is one of the original 40 throws of Judo
as developed by Jigoro Kano. It belongs to the first group, Dai Ikkyo, of the traditional throwing list, Gokyo (no waza), of Kodokan Judo. It is also included in the current 67 Throws of Kodokan Judo. It is classified as a foot technique, Ashi-Waza.

Technique description 
In a classical right-handed osotogari, tori steps next to uke with his left leg and reaps uke's right leg (at the back of the thigh) with his right leg.

Similar techniques, variants, and aliases 
English aliases:
large outer reap

Similar techniques:
 o soto otoshi
 o soto gaeshi
 o soto guruma
 o soto gake

Further reading

Judo technique
Throw (grappling)